Free the Fish is a 2000 Italian comedy film directed by Cristina Comencini. The film was nominated to three Nastro d'Argento awards.

Cast 
Laura Morante: Mara
Michele Placido: Michele Verrio
Francesco Paolantoni: Sergio
Emilio Solfrizzi: Emilio
Lunetta Savino: Lunetta

References

External links

2000 films
Italian comedy films
Films directed by Cristina Comencini
2000 comedy films